Rashaan is a given name. Notable people with the name include:

Rashaan Evans (born 1995), American football player
Rashaan Fernandes (born 1989), Dutch footballer
Rashaan Gaulden (born 1995), American football player
Rashaan Melvin (born 1989), American football player
Rashaan Nall (born 1980), American actor
Rashaan Salaam (1974–2016), American football player
Rashaan Shehee (born 1975), American football player

See also
Rashan (given name)
Rashaun, given name
Rashawn, given name